Professor Michael H. Gelb (born 1957) is an American biochemist and chemist specializing in enzymes and particularly those of medical significance.  He is the Boris and Barbara L. Weinstein Endowed Chair in Chemistry at the University of Washington in Seattle.  He also teaches Honors Organic Chemistry, Chemical Biology and Enzymology.

Education

Gelb studied chemistry and biochemistry at the University of California, Davis before taking a Ph.D under Stephen G. Sligar at Yale University on aspects of the catalytic mechanism of cytochrome P450. Granted an American Cancer Society postdoctoral fellowship, he then investigated mechanism-based inactivators of serine proteases and developed fluorinated ketones as tight-binding inhibitors of several classes of proteases, working with Robert H. Abeles at Brandeis University.

Professional life

Since 1985 Gelb has been a faculty member at the University of Washington in the Departments of Chemistry and Biochemistry.

The Gelb laboratory uses a number of techniques in molecular and cellular biochemistry as well as synthetic organic chemistry to study enzymatic processes of biomedical significance.  Major accomplishments from the Gelb laboratory include: 1) The discovery of protein isoprenylation in the late 1980s (together with Professor John Glomset); 2) The development of methods to analyze enzymes that work on membrane surfaces (together with Professors Mahendra Jain and Otto Berg); 3) The development of Isotope-Coded Affinity Tags  for quantitative proteomics (together with Professors Ruedi Aebersold and Frank Turecek); 4) The development of tandem mass spectrometry for newborn screening of enzyme deficiency diseases (together with Professors Frank Turecek and C. Ronald Scott). Routine newborn screening of lysosomal storage diseases using technology developed in the Gelb laboratory was brought into use in New York state in 2006 
.  Plans are underway to expand screening in other regions of the US and in several other countries.

His current research interests include: 1) Studying the function and regulation of a group of enzymes called phospholipase A2 that are involved in lipid mediator biosynthesis related to  inflammation; 2) Anti-malaria and anti-trypanosome drug discovery; 3) New technology for the newborn screening of enzyme deficiency diseases including lysosomal storage diseases.

Awards

Gelb's awards include:
Gustavus John Esselen Award (2013) for Chemistry in the Public Interest, NE Section, American Chemical Society (2013)
 Fellow of the American Association for the Advancement of Science  (AAAS) (2009-)
 Harry and Catherine Jaynne Boand Endowed Professor of Chemistry (2008-)
 Merit Award from the National Institutes of Health (2007-)
Medicines for Malaria Venture Project of the Year (2002).
 Pfizer Award in Enzyme Chemistry from the American Chemical Society  (1993).
  ICI Pharmaceuticals Award for Excellence in Chemistry (1993).
 Alfred P. Sloan Fellow.
 Merck New Faculty Development Award (1986).
  American Cancer Society  Postdoctoral Fellowship (1983–85).

Personal life

In his spare time, Gelb mostly enjoys surfing in Indonesia where he has been exploring all around on his surfboard with his surf mates Effhendy and Dika. He also likes playing classical guitar and shaping his own brand of surf boards.

Notes and references

External links
The Gelb lab website at the University of Washington.
Medicines for Malaria Venture website.

1957 births
Living people
American biochemists
University of Washington faculty
University of California, Davis alumni